Filip Zalevski (born 3 January 1984) is a Ukrainian pair skater. He began representing Bulgaria internationally with Nina Ivanova in 2008. They placed 6th at the 2008 Golden Spin of Zagreb.

He had previously competed representing Ukraine. With former partner Alina Dikhtiar, he is the 2006 Ukrainian silver medalist and 2005 Junior national champion. He had also competed with Julia Cherkashina and Aliona Yarulina, with whom he is the 2000 Ukrainian national bronze medalist.

Programs

With Ivanova

With Dikhtiar

Competitive highlights

With Ivanova for Bulgaria

With Dikhtiar for Ukraine

With Yarulina for Ukraine

References

External links
 
 
 Dikhtiar / Zalevski at Tracings.net
 Pairs on Ice: Dikhtiar & Zalevski

Ukrainian male pair skaters
Bulgarian pair skaters
Sportspeople from Odesa
1984 births
Living people